Urodeta inusta is a moth of the family Elachistidae. It is found in north-western Western Australia.

The wingspan is 7.2–7.8 mm for males and 7-7.2 mm for females.

References

Moths described in 2011
Elachistidae
Moths of Australia